The Jimmy Show is a 2001 drama written and directed by Frank Whaley, based on the Off-Broadway play Veins and Thumbtacks by Jonathan Marc Sherman. The film stars Whaley, Carla Gugino, and Ethan Hawke. The film premiered at the 2001 Toronto International Film Festival and also screened at the 2002 Sundance Film Festival.

Synopsis
The film centers on the life of Jimmy O'Brien (Frank Whaley), a warehouse clerk by day and a standup comedian by night. He is also a failure as an inventor. He lives with his wife (Carla Gugino), daughter, and a disabled grandmother. Jimmy's aspiration to succeed contrasts sharply with the numbness of his pothead friend Ray (Ethan Hawke), who is just trying to get by. When performing, Jimmy contradicts the role of a comedian and instead uses the stand-up form to relate the tragedies in his life, which causes indifferent to hostile reactions from the audience; however, he also provokes members of the audience. Eventually Jimmy is fired from his day job for stealing beer, which he abuses, and his wife leaves him. He winds up working at a Middle-Eastern fast-food restaurant. At the end of the film, Jimmy runs seemingly aimlessly in different directions in what appears to be him either on the verge of nervous breakdown or spiritual awakening.

Cast
Frank Whaley as Jimmy O'Brien
Carla Gugino as Annie O'Brien
Ethan Hawke as Ray
Lynn Cohen as Ruth
Jillian Stacom as Wendy
Spelman M. Beaubrun as Claude
Sheila Kay Davis as Social Worker

Production
The film was shot in Staten Island, the same location used by Frank Whaley in his 1999 drama Joe the King.

References

External links
 
 
 
 Full movie on YouTube

2001 films
2001 drama films
American films based on plays
Films directed by Frank Whaley
2001 independent films
Films set in New Jersey
Films shot in New Jersey
Films shot in New York (state)
American drama films
2000s English-language films
2000s American films